Mila Alekseevna Sivatskaya (born December 3, 1998, Kyiv, Ukraine) is a Ukrainian film actress, known for her role as Vasilisa in the Russian fantasy trilogy Last Knight.

Biography 
As a child, she took up dancing. In 2011, she participated in the Ukrainian national selection for the  Junior Eurovision Song Contest as part of the girls band. In 2012, she took part in the Ukrainian contest Voice: Children. She worked as a photo model, featuring on the covers of children's magazines and catalogs. She was a presenter on UA:First. She has been acting in films since the age of ten.

Aged 19, she played one of the main roles in the Russian comedy fairytale Last Knight (2017), which became the highest-grossing film in the history of Russian cinema after a month of release.

In April 2022, due to her criticism of the Russian invasion of Ukraine, Mila Sivatskaya was banned from entering the territory of the Russian Federation.

Selected filmography
 2013-14 —  Muhtar's Return as Angela (Season 8); Dasha (Season 9)  
 2014 — Synevyr as Ivanka
 2017 — Last Knight as Vasilisa the Wise
 2020 — The Last Warrior: Root of Evil as  Vasilisa the Wise 
 2020 — Cossacks. Absolutely False Story as Mariana
 2021 — The Last Warrior: A Messenger of Darkness as  Vasilisa the Wise

References

External links
 
 Mila Sivatskaya at KinoPoisk

1998 births
Living people
Actors from Kyiv
TikTokers
Ukrainian television actresses
21st-century Ukrainian actresses
Ukrainian film actresses
Ukrainian women television presenters
Ukrainian female models
Ukrainian child actresses
Child models